The Neoliberal Party (Partido Neo-Liberal - PALI) is a Nicaraguan neoliberal right-wing political party that split from the Independent Liberal Party (PLI) in 1986. PALI received legal status on appeal in 1989. In 2006, PLIUN was part of the Constitutionalist Liberal Party electoral alliance in the 2006 general election.

1989 establishments in Nicaragua
Liberal parties in Nicaragua
Neoliberal parties
Political parties established in 1989